Kendall House may refer to:

In the United States (by state, city)

 Noble–Kendall House, Albia, Iowa, listed on the National Register of Historic Places (NRHP) in Monroe County, Iowa
 Deacon Thomas Kendall House, Wakefield, Massachusetts, NRHP-listed
 Silas W. Kendall House, Kalamazoo, Michigan, NRHP-listed
 Wallace Warren and Lillian Genevieve Bradshaw Kendall House, Superior, Nebraska, NRHP-listed
 Zeb Kendall House, Tonopah, Nevada, NRHP-listed
 Joseph Kendall House, Portland, Oregon, NRHP-listed